Merag is a village in Croatia, located on the east coast of Cres. It is connected by ferry to Valbiska on Krk and is accessed via the D101 road which is connected to the D100 road, the main road on the island of Cres. The village has a population of 10.

References

Populated places in Primorje-Gorski Kotar County
Cres